San Kim Sean (born March 24, 1945) is a martial artist living in Asia. He often referred to as the father of modern Bokator and is largely credited with reviving the art. 
At age 13, he studied bokator under Master Khim Leak at Wat Mohamandrey. 
San Kim Sean's bokator master, Khem Leak, came from a martial arts family in Pursat province.  Master Khem Leak's father and grandfather were also martial artists.  San Kim Sean also studied boxing under Master Chai Chheng in 1959 and 1960.  He studied Judo under Kru So Meng Hong.  He studied Hapkido under Korean master Chhay Yong Ho.

San Kim Sean is the founder of the Cambodia Bokator Federation and the Cambodia Bokator Academy.

The term Bokator translates as pounding a lion from the words bok meaning to pound and tor meaning lion.

At the time of the Pol Pot regime (1975–1979) those who practiced traditional arts were either systematically exterminated by the Khmer Rouge, fled as refugees or stopped teaching. After the Khmer Rouge regime, the Vietnamese occupation of Cambodia began and native martial arts were completely outlawed. 

After the Pol Pot era, San Kim Sean had to flee Cambodia to the United States under accusations by the Vietnamese of teaching hapkido and Bokator. 

Once in America, San Kim Sean started teaching hapkido at a local YMCA in Houston, Texas and later moved to Long Beach, California. After living in the United States and teaching and promoting hapkido, San Kim Sean decided to return to Cambodia to revive Bokator. San Kim Sean left the United States in 1992 and returned home  to give Bokator back to his people.

In 2001, San Kim Sean moved to Phnom Penh and after getting permission from the new King Norodom Sihanouk to begin teaching bokator to the local youth. That same year in the hopes of bringing all of the remaining living masters together San Kim Sean began traveling the country seeking out Bokator  lok kru, or instructors, who had survived the Khmer Rouge regime. The few men San Kim Sean found were old, ranging from sixty to ninety years of age; many were afraid to teach the art of Bokator openly. After much persuasion and with government approval, San Kim Sean effectively reintroduced Bokator to the Cambodian people.

References

External links

1945 births
Living people
Cambodian martial artists